The Hermes House Band is a Dutch pop band, established in 1982 by members of the Rotterdamsch Studenten Corps, a fraternity/sorority in Rotterdam, Netherlands. They have released more than 25 albums and singles.

History
The band rose to fame in 1994 in both the Netherlands and Belgium, with their cover of Gloria Gaynor's hit single, "I Will Survive"; and as of 2018 over 1.5 million copies of the single has been sold. It was reported that when Gloria Gaynor first heard a crowd sing this version of the cover of her song while performing at a company party in the Netherlands she was "not amused". In 1998, the single became a hit in Germany, and lead singer Judith Ansems was asked to promote the song there. That year it also reached number one in France, greatly because it became the anthem of the national football team and that year France went on to win the FIFA World Cup. Today, in popular French culture, it is still associated with the 1998 World Cup victory. The band landed a local recording contract with Polydor and alongside Ansems, former singers Jop Wijlacker and Robin Maas, the band was asked to record other covers, including "Country Roads" and "Que Sera Sera". These were issued in Germany under HHB International. Several of these singles were also released in the Netherlands.

Their biggest hit in the United Kingdom was their cover of "Country Roads", released shortly before Christmas 2001. It peaked at No. 7 in the UK Singles Chart, and remained in the Top 10 for five weeks. It reached number 1 in the Scottish Singles Chart in December 2001 and again in January 2002.

In 2002, the Hermes House Band joined forces with DJ Ötzi to cover "Live Is Life", originally by Opus. This single reached No. 2 in the French chart, and No. 50 in the UK.

In 2010, the former lead singer of the band, Jaap van Reesema, won the third series of the Dutch version of X Factor.

In 2018, the band reached No.1 in France again with their version of "I Will Survive" after the French football team repeated their winning performance in the 1998 FIFA World Cup.

Band members
Current members
 Miss Sally – vocals
 Mr. Jop – vocals
 Bas Vegas – bass guitar
 Sjoerd de Freeze – keyboards
 Lex Flex – drums
 Dieter Uboot – saxophone
 Tropical Danny – guitar

Former members
 Judith Ansems – vocals
 Jaap Reesema – vocals
 Robin McMaas – vocals
 Gerben Kline Willing – trumpet
 Dirk Bates – trumpet

Discography
The Album (2002)
 "I Will Survive"
 "Que Sera Sera"
 "Tonight's the Night"
 "Na Na Hey Hey Kiss Him Goodbye"
 "As novinha tão sensacional"
 "Disco Samba, Pt. 2 (Back to Brasil)"
 "Holiday Express (Kedeng Kedeng)"
 "Don't You Cry (Bye, Bye)"
 "Can't Take My Eyes Off Of You"
 "Country Roads"
 Megamix: "I Will Survive"/"Nana Hey Hey Kiss Him Goodbye"/"Can't Take ..."

Get Ready to Party (2004)
 "All Over the World"
 "Those Were the Days"
 "Live is Life"
 "Football's Coming Home (Three Lions)"
 "Portugal"
 "Hit the Road Jack"
 "Suzanna"
 "I Am What I Am"
 "Everytime You Touch Me"
 "Me ; Margarita"
 "Can't Stop This Thing We Started"
 "It's in the Way You Want Me"
 "All Come Together"
 "Ain't No Mountain High Enough"
 "Born to Rock and Roll"
 "Never Give In"
 "One More for the Road"
 "Happy Birthday Baby"
 "Celebrate! The HHB Summermedley!"

Rhythm of the Night (2008)
 "The Rhythm of the Night" (Party mix)
 "The Rhythm of the Night" (Extended mix)

Greatest Hits (2006)
 "Go West"
 "I Will Survive 2006"
 "(Is This The Way To) Amarillo" - Tony Christie
 "Football's Coming Home 2006 (Three Lions)"
 "Live is Life"
 "Que Sera Sera"
 "Can't Take My Eyes Off of You"
 "Country Roads"
 "Those Were the Days"
 "Hit the Road Jack"
 "Suzanna"
 "Friends Like You"
 "Everytime You Touch Me"
 "Me ; Margarita"
 "All come together"
 "Portugal"
 "One More for the Road"
 "I Will Survive"

Rhythm of the Nineties (2009)
 "The First the Last Eternity"
 "The Rhythm of the Night"
 "Saturday Night"
 "I've Been Thinking About You"
 "Party Polka"
 "Everybody's Free (To Feel Good)"
 "Rhythm is a Dancer"
 "Somewhere Over the Rainbow"
 "The Moment of Truth"
 "What is Love"
 "The Only Way is Up"
 "No Limit"
 "Please Don't Go (Don't You)"
 "Come on Eileen"
 "Don't Worry Be Happy"

Champions - The Greatest Stadium Hits (2010)
 "Chelsea Dagger"
 "Football's Coming Home 2006 (Three Lions)"
 "I Will Survive"
 "Que Sera Sera"
 "Country Roads"
 "Seven Nation Army"
 "Sweet Caroline"
 "Na, Na, Hey, Hey, Kiss Him Goodbye"
 "Hit The Road Jack"
 "Go West"
 "Those Were The Days"
 "Live Is Life (JB Mix)"
 "Come On Eileen"
 "The Moment Of Truth"
 "Please Don't Go"
 "Football MegamiX (XXL Party Version)"

References

External links
Hermeshouseband.com
Hermeshouseband.nl

Musical groups from Rotterdam
Musical groups established in 1982
Dutch Eurodance groups
Dutch pop music groups
1982 establishments in the Netherlands